7th Street may refer to:

Urban roadways
 7th Street (Johannesburg), South Africa
 7th Street (New York City), a street in Manhattan, United States
 7th Street (Washington, D.C.), United States
 Carrera Séptima (7th Street), a street in Bogotá, Colombia

Other
 Seventh Street (horse), an American Thoroughbred racehorse
 "7th Street", final round, also known as River (poker), of cards in 7-card stud
7th Street station (disambiguation), train stations of the name

See also 
7th Street Entry, Minnesota music venue